Sodano is a surname. Notable people with the surname include:

 Angelo Sodano (1927–2022), Italian Cardinal of the Catholic Church
 Frankie Sodano (1931–2015), American boxer
 Nicola Sodano (born 1978), Italian politician
 Vittorio Sodano (born 1974), Italian make-up artist